Meriwether may refer to:

People
 Meriwether (name), includes a list of people with the name
 Meriwether Lewis (1774–1809), American explorer, soldier, and public administrator

Places
 Meriwether, Louisville, a neighborhood in Kentucky, United States
 Meriwether, Georgia, an unincorporated community, United States
 Meriwether County, Georgia, United States

Other
 SS Meriwether Lewis, a Liberty ship built in the US during World War II
 Meriwether (band), American rock band, and the title to their 2004 EP
 Meriwether National Golf Club, located near Hillsboro, Oregon
 The Meriwether, a pair of condominium towers in Portland, Oregon

See also
 Camp Meriwether (disambiguation)
 Merryweather (disambiguation)
 Merriweather